Daniel Bernard (born July 28, 1959) is a Canadian politician, who has served three non-consecutive terms as Member of the National Assembly for the electoral district of Rouyn-Noranda–Témiscamingue. First elected as a member of the Quebec Liberal Party in the 2003 Quebec general election, he served until he was defeated by Johanne Morasse of the Parti Québécois in the 2007 Quebec general election; he was then re-elected in the same district, defeating Morasse, in the 2008 Quebec general election, serving a single term and not running for re-election in the 2012 Quebec general election.

In the 2022 Quebec general election, he was reelected to the legislature as a member of the Coalition Avenir Québec.

Bernard is an alumnus of the Université Laval and the Université du Québec à Montréal. At Laval, he obtained a bachelor's degree in sciences and geology in 1982 and a master's degree in structural geology in 1987. At the UQAM he received an MBA in 2000.

Bernard worked as a project engineer for the SOQUEM from 1992 to 1994, at Barrick Gold from 1994 to 1997 and Inmet Mines from 1997 to 1999. From 1999 to his election in 2003 he held managing duties at Pershimco Mining, the Quebec Mining Exploitation Association and 3E Consultant Firm in Rouyn-Noranda as well as Globex Mining Company between his two terms in 2007–08.

Bernard was briefly the Parliamentary Assistant to the Minister of Agriculture, Fisheries and Food in 2007.

He briefly sat on Rouyn-Noranda City Council, having been elected in the 2021 municipal election before being elected back to the National Assembly in 2022.

References

External links
 

1959 births
Canadian engineers
French Quebecers
Living people
Quebec Liberal Party MNAs
Université Laval alumni
Université du Québec à Montréal alumni
21st-century Canadian politicians
Coalition Avenir Québec MNAs
Quebec municipal councillors